The 2020 season is Clube de Regatas do Flamengo's 125th year of existence, their 109th football season, and their 50th in the Brazilian Série A, having never been relegated from the top division. In addition to the 2020 Campeonato Brasileiro Série A, Flamengo also competed in the CONMEBOL Copa Libertadores, the Copa do Brasil, and the Campeonato Carioca, the top tier of Rio de Janeiro's state football league, Supercopa do Brasil and Recopa Sudamericana.

Kits
Supplier: Adidas / Sponsor: Banco BRB / Back of the shirt: MRV / Lower back: Total / Shoulder: Sportsbet.io / Numbers: TIM / Shorts: Azeite Royal / Socks: Orthopride

Pre-season and friendlies

Competitions

Overview

Supercopa do Brasil

Goals and red cards are shown.

Recopa Sudamericana

Goals and red cards are shown.

Campeonato Carioca

Taça Guanabara

Goals and red cards are shown.

Taça Rio

Goals and red cards are shown.

Final stage

Copa Libertadores

The group stage draw for the 2020 Copa Libertadores was conducted on 17 December 2019.

Group stage

Goals and red cards are shown.

Knockout stage

Round of 16
Goals and red cards are shown.

Tied 2–2 on aggregate, Racing won on penalties and advanced to the quarter-finals

Campeonato Brasileiro

League table

Results by round

Goals and red cards are shown.

Copa do Brasil

As Flamengo will participate in the 2020 Copa Libertadores, the club will enter the Copa do Brasil in the round of 16.

Round of 16

Goals and red cards are shown.

Flamengo won 4–2 on aggregate and advanced to the quarter-finals.

Quarter-final
Goals and red cards are shown.

São Paulo won 5–1 on aggregate and advanced to the semi-finals.

Management team

Roster

Transfers and loans

Transfers in

Loan in

Transfers out

Loan out

Statistics
Players in italics have left the club before the end of the season.

Appearances

Goalscorers

Assists

Clean sheets

Notes

References

External links
 Clube de Regatas do Flamengo
 Flamengo official website (in Portuguese)

Brazilian football clubs 2020 season
CR Flamengo seasons